Mercedes Airport is a public use airport serving Mercedes, a town in the Corrientes Province of Argentina.

The Mercedes non-directional beacon (Ident: RCE) is located on the field.

See also

Transport in Argentina
List of airports in Argentina

References

External links 
OpenStreetMap - Mercedes Airport

Airports in Argentina
Corrientes Province